The 2015–16 Israeli Women's Cup (Gvia HaMedina Nashim) was the 18th season of Israel's women's nationwide football cup competition. The competition began on 8 December 2015 with 5 first round matches. 

F.C. Kiryat Gat won the cup, beating ASA Tel Aviv University 1–0 in the final.

Results

First round

Quarter-finals
As seven clubs progressed to this round, F.C. Ramat HaSharon received a bye into the semi-finals.

Semi-finals

Final

References

External links
2015–16 State Cup Women Israeli Football Association 

Israel Women's Cup seasons
cup
Israel